Colleters are plant structures, multicellular secretory hairs, found in groups near the base of petioles, on stipules, and on sepals.  They are found in members of the Loganiaceae and Rubiaceae families.

References

Plant morphology